The Fatal Flaw: A Special Edition of 20/20 (also known as The Fatal Flaw or Fatal Flaw) is an American four-part television documentary series that premiered on ABC on July 7, 2022.

Episodes

References

External links

2020s American documentary television series
2022 American television series debuts
2022 American television series endings
American Broadcasting Company original programming
English-language television shows
Historical television series
ABC News